The 2019–20 Morehead State Eagles men's basketball team represented Morehead State University during the 2019–20 NCAA Division I men's basketball season. The Eagles, led by third-year head coach Preston Spradlin, played their home games at Ellis Johnson Arena in Morehead, Kentucky as members of the Ohio Valley Conference. They finished the season 13–19, 7–11 in OVC play to finish in eighth place. They lost in the first round of the OVC tournament to Tennessee State.

Previous season 
The Eagles finished the 2018–19 season 13–20, 8–10 in OVC play to finish in 5th place. They qualified for the OVC tournament, where they defeated SIU Edwardsville in the first-round before losing to Austin Peay in the quarterfinals.

Roster

Schedule and results

|-
!colspan=9 style=| Exhibition

|-
!colspan=9 style=| Non-Conference Regular Season

|-
!colspan=9 style=| OVC Regular Season

|-
!colspan=9 style=|Ohio Valley tournament

Source

References

Morehead State Eagles men's basketball seasons
Morehead State
Morehead State
Morehead State